Nam tok (Lao: ນ້ຳຕົກ) is either a soup or a meat salad from Southeast Asia. In the Lao and Thai language, the phrase means waterfall. The meat salad in Lao cuisine is just a sliced instead of minced meat version of larb, Laos' national dish. 

Nam tok can refer to two different kinds of preparation:

In Central Thailand, nam tok is mainly a spicy soup stock enriched with raw cow blood or pig's blood. Blood is often used in Thailand to enrich regular noodle dishes. One of the most popular variants of the nam tok noodle soup is known as kuai-tiao mu nam tok. It includes broth, blood, noodles, bean sprouts, pieces of liver, pork, dumplings, green vegetables and spices. This type of soup has an intense, rich and pleasant taste and is often served by streetside vendors in small food stalls.
Nam tok can be also an Isan and Lao meat dish which is similar to lap (larb). This dish is known in Lao as ping sin nam tok and in Thai as nuea yang nam tok ("waterfall grilled beef"), if made with beef, and as mu nam tok ("waterfall pork"), if made with pork. The name supposedly refers to the fact that there is still "water", or liquid, in the meat, that is, blood. The "dressing" of this meat-based salad is made with ground roasted rice, ground dried chillies, fish sauce, lime juice, shallots and mint leaves. It can also feature spring onions. It is traditionally eaten with sticky rice and comes with raw vegetables such as thua fak yao (yardlong beans) and kalam pli (cabbage).

See also
Larb
Lao cuisine
Thai cuisine
Thai salads

References

External links
Pictures of Nam Tok
Health concerns from eating raw blood

Thai soups
Blood soups
Lao cuisine
Salads